Untold Festival is the largest electronic music festival held in Romania, taking place in Cluj-Napoca at the Cluj Arena. It is held annually and has been designated Best Major Festival in the European Festival Awards 2015. Guests come from a vast range of European countries, as well as Asia and North America.

History
Untold's official website refers to editions as chapters.

Untold: Chapter 1 
The first edition of the festival took place in 2015 mainly on Cluj Arena, when Cluj-Napoca was appointed the European Youth Capital. The main artists that performed were: Armin van Buuren, Avicii, David Guetta, Dimitri Vegas & Like Mike and ATB. Other performing artists were: Duke Dumont, Fedde Le Grand, Lost Frequencies, Sasha, Sunnery James & Ryan Marciano, Tinie Tempah, Tom Odell, John Newman, Fatman Scoop, Tujamo, John Digweed, Patrice, Boney M, Culture Beat and East 17, among others. During the four days of the festival, more than 240,000 people attended the concerts held on several stages in the centre of Cluj-Napoca. It pulled in €20 million in revenue.

Untold: Chapter 2 
The second edition of Untold took place in 2016, from 4 to 7 August mainly on Cluj Arena. It welcomed the top 5 DJ's of the world polled by DJ Mag that year: Tiësto, Hardwell, Martin Garrix, Dimitri Vegas & Like Mike and Armin van Buuren, along with Afrojack. Other performing live artists were: Dannic, Fedde Le Grand, Naughty Boy, Lost Frequencies, Faithless, Parov Stellar, Scooter, Ella Eyre, James Arthur, Kwabs, Labrinth, John Digweed, Sasha, Nneka and Tujamo. It took place during four days in the centre of Cluj-Napoca and involved 10 stages. Over 30,000 foreigners attended the 2016 edition. The festival itself attracted a crowd of 300,000 over four days.

Untold: Chapter 3 
The third edition of the festival took place from 3 to 6 August 2017 on Cluj Arena. There were seven DJ headliners who were announced in January 2017: Afrojack, Armin van Buuren, Axwell Λ Ingrosso, Dimitri Vegas & Like Mike, Hardwell, Martin Garrix, Marshmello and Steve Aoki. In March the live acts were announced, these being: Ellie Goulding, Example, Hurts, Jasmine Thompson, MØ, John Newman and Tinie Tempah. The festival took place during four days in the centre of Cluj-Napoca and involved 10 stages. Other performing artists were: Alan Walker, Don Diablo, Dillon Francis, Charli XCX, Redfoo, Era Istrefi, The Avener, Dannic, Lost Frequencies, Sander van Doorn, Dubfire, Kadebostany, Jamie Jones, Loco Dice, Solomun, Sven Väth, Andy C, Borgore, Pendulum, Chase & Status and GTA, among others. It sold over 330,000 tickets for the four days of Untold and reported record profit (more than in 2015). Untold organisers invested more than €10 million in the festival.

Untold: Chapter 4 

The fourth edition of the Untold festival was held from 2 to 5 August 2018. The first artists announced for the 2018 edition are: Black Eyed Peas, KSHMR, The Prodigy, Bonobo, Afrojack, Armin van Buuren, Alesso, Dimitri Vegas & Like Mike, Diplo, Kygo, The Chainsmokers, Jason Derulo, Tiësto, Fedde Le Grand and Steve Aoki.

Untold: Chapter 5 
The fifth edition of the Untold festival was held from 1 to 4 August 2019. The first two rounds of ticket sales sold out within respectively 3 and 10 minutes, each having 15,000 festival tickets available. Amongst the first artists announced for the 2019 edition were: Robbie Williams, Martin Garrix, David Guetta, Bastille, James Arthur, Dimitri Vegas & Like Mike, Timmy Trumpet, Boris Brejcha, Silenzio and Tale Of Us. Armin van Buuren released the official anthem of Untold Chapter 5, "Something Real", on 12 July 2019.

The festival, in conjunction with YouTube Music, officially released 6 playlists exclusive to the service, which are the UNTOLD Main Stage, UNTOLD Alchemy, UNTOLD Fortune, UNTOLD Forest, Daydreaming Experience and  UNTOLD Galaxy

This edition gathered a crowd of 370,000 over four days, making it the most successful chapter in history.

Untold: Chapter 6 
The sixth edition of Untold is planned to take place in 2021, 9-12 september, event was postponed due to COVID-19 outbreak. Announcement on the 2021 festival will be posted December 15, 2020, Refunds and tickets to the next 3 festivals are available to 2020 ticket holders.https://untold.com/faqpostponement

Untold: Chapter 7 
The seventh edition of the festival took place between 4 to 7 August 2022. The main headliners were J Balvin, Anne-Marie and a wide range of DJs: Kygo, Lost Frequencies, David Guetta, Steve Aoki, Dimitri Vegas & Like Mike, Tujamo, Paul Kalkbrenner.

In 2016 Untold became the international ambassador of Romania and Transylvania, the land of Dracula, the festival bracelet allowing visitors to visit for free or at a discounted rate a series of major Romanian sights such as Bran Castle, Corvin Castle, the Merry Cemetery, the Mocănița Steam Train, the Turda Salt Mines, and many other touristic attractions. The initiative aimed at supporting Romanian tourism, by inviting guests to stay longer and explore the no. 1 must-see destination of 2016, according to Lonely Planet

References
 18. Postponement page "https://untold.com/faqpostponement

External links

Review of Untold Festival 2015

Music festivals established in 2015
Electronic music festivals in Romania
2015 establishments in Romania
Summer events in Romania